Constant Energy Struggles is the fourth studio album by American hip hop duo Ces Cru. The album was released on March 26, 2013, by Strange Music. The album features guest appearances from Tech N9ne, Liz Suwandi, JL B. Hood and Mac Lethal. The album debuted at number 98 on the Billboard 200 chart.

Background
In an August 2012, interview with HipHopDX, Godemis spoke about the album saying: "We are in the very very early stages of making this [the LP]. We're just getting beat submissions and doing some writing. I've been writing like a madman. The title is going to be Constant Energy Struggle. Blaow! That's my first time saying that. The title is going to be Constant Energy Struggle and all that that implies. I think in that way, the album is going to be more well rounded. I think we're going to try to take the opportunity to open up a little bit, if you will, and let the fans know exactly how we feel and exactly what's been going on. I know that may not sound so cool sometimes, but we're also gonna talk about all the cool shit that's been happening to us. It's going to be a well rounded album in that way. There will be a lot more substance than there is on 13."

Critical reception

Upon its release, Constant Energy Struggles was met with generally positive reviews. David Jeffries of AllMusic gave the album four out of five stars, saying "Tech N9ne's Strange Music label has some "true hip-hop" releases in its back catalog, for sure, but when Ces Cru puts down "We diversified the label/They called it 'Strange-hop'" within their first minute of their debut for the label, they're merely getting the issue out of the way. From then on, it's right to business, street business, that is, with a classic, Mobb Deep feel for the beats and the flow, topped with a Black Star-quality rhyme book." David "Rek" Lee of HipHopDX gave the album three out of five stars, saying "Fans might compare them to mainstream so-and-so who can't form proper sentences, but these are emcees who are striving for greatness and at times their rhymes just aren't there yet. They've graduated from the school of rhyming "lyrical-spiritual-miracle," but there are moments where it feels as if they're still having ciphers in the parking lot. It's a very solid first outing on a bigger stage."

Commercial performance
The album debuted at number 98 on the Billboard 200 chart, with first-week sales of 5,400 copies in the United States.

Track listing

Notes
 Track listing and credits from album booklet.
 "Juice" features scratches by DJ Sku.
 "Prefade" features additional vocals by Young Prez.
 "Perception" features keyboards by Reggie B.
 "Confession" features keyboards by Joe Miquelon and bass guitar by Jimmy Dykes.
 "Bread Break" features additional vocals by Smartalec On The Track.
 "Wall E" features additional vocals by Seven, Christina Summers, Matt Peters, Bobby Pulliam and Carrine Spinks.
 "Daydream" features keyboards by Joe Miquelon and bass guitar by Jimmy Dykes.

Sample credits
 "Prefade" contains samples of "Klick, Clack, Bang" as performed by Ces Cru.
 "Bread Break" contains samples of "6 Minits" as performed by Godemis.

Personnel
Credits for Constant Energy Struggles adapted from the album liner notes.

 Richie Abbott – publicity
 Tom Baker – mastering
 Aaron Bean – marketing & promotions, street marketing
 Brent Bradley – internet marketing
 Violet Brown – production assistant
 Valdora Case – production assistant
 Jared Coop – merchandising
 Glenda Cowan – production assistant
 Ben Cybulsky – mixing, producer
 DJ Sku – scratches
 Jimmy Dykes – bass guitar
 Penny Ervin – merchandising
 Braxton Flemming – merchandising
 Godemis – primary artist
 Ben Grossi – project consultant, general management
 Mary Harris – merchandising
 Info Gates – producer
 JL B. Hood – featured artist
 Leonard Dstroy – producer
 Robert Lieberman – legal
 Ryan Lindberg – internet marketing
 Liquid 9 – art direction & design
 Korey Lloyd – production assistant, project management
 James Meierotto – photography
 Joe Miquelon – keyboards
 Jeff Nelson – internet marketing
 Cory Nielsen – production assistant
 Dawn O'Guin – production assistant
 Travis O'Guin – executive producer, A&R
 Matt Peters – producer, additional vocals
 Bobby Pulliam – producer, additional vocals
 Jose Ramirez – street marketing
 Reggie B. – keyboards
 Victor Sandoval – internet marketing
 Brian Shafton – project consultant, general management
 Smartalec On The Track – additional vocals
 Carrine Spinks – additional vocals
 Christina Summers – additional vocals
 Michael "Seven" Summers – producer, additional vocals
 Liz Suwandi – featured artist
 Tech N9ne – featured artist
 Ubiquitous – primary artist
 Dave Weiner – A&R, associate producer
 Young Prez – additional vocals

Charts

References

2013 albums
Albums produced by Seven (record producer)
Strange Music albums